Yadu is the founder of the Yadu dynasty in Hinduism. He is described to be the eldest son of King Yayati, and his queen, Devayani.

Legend 
According to a narrative found in the Mahabharata, and the Vishnu Purana, Yadu refused to exchange his years of youth with his father, Yayati, when the latter was cursed with senility by his father-in-law, Shukra. Thus, he was cursed by Yayati to have his progeny disinherited of the dominion. Due to this proclamation, Yadu was replaced by his step-brother, Puru, as the heir to the throne of the Chandravansha dynasty. Yadu founded his own cadet branch of the dynasty, called the Yaduvansha.

Descendants 
The Agni Purana states that Yadu's lineage was continued by his eldest son, Sahasrajit. Sahasrajit had three sons: Haihaya, Reṇuhaya, and Haya.

A historical dynasty called the Haihayas claimed descent from Haihaya.

Several castes and communities in modern India, such as Ahir, Yadav, Yaduvanshi Aheer descent from Yadu.

See also 
 Raghu
 Ikshvaku
 Bharata

References 

Mahabharata
Hindu mythology